Barbara R. Sears (born December 5, 1966) is a Republican politician who formerly represented the 47th District of the Ohio House of Representatives from 2008 to 2016. She served as the Majority Floor Leader in the Ohio House of Representatives. Her district included much of suburban Toledo, Ohio.

Life and career
Sears graduated from the University of Toledo in 1983.
 She served on the city council of Sylvania, Ohio from 1998–2008, serving as president of the council from 2004–2008. She is a co-owner of Noble and Sears, Inc.

Currently, she lives in Monclova Township, Ohio.  She has two sons.

Ohio House of Representatives
In 2008, Sears was appointed to the Ohio House to succeed Mark Wagoner, who had resigned to serve in the Ohio Senate. She won reelection in 2008 and 2010.

In 2012, Sears won election to a third term, defeating Democrat Jeff Bunck with 60.18% of the vote. Sears came under fire from ultra-conservatives in 2014 for her outspoken support for Medicaid expansion, which many saw as a facet of Obamacare.  Regardless, she easily won a primary for her seat to take another term in 2014.

Sears won a final term in 2014 unopposed and served as House Majority Leader for half of the 131st Ohio General Assembly.  She resigned prior to the expiration of her term in 2016 to the Assistant Director of the Governor's Office of Health Transformation for Ohio Governor John Kasich.  On December 23, 2016 she was  sworn in as Ohio's new Medicaid director.

References

External links
Campaign website

1961 births
Politicians from Youngstown, Ohio
Living people
Republican Party members of the Ohio House of Representatives
People from Sylvania, Ohio
University of Toledo alumni
Women state legislators in Ohio
21st-century American politicians
21st-century American women politicians
People from Lucas County, Ohio